Stare Byliny  is a village in the administrative district of Gmina Rawa Mazowiecka, within Rawa County, Łódź Voivodeship, in central Poland.

The name translates to "old heroic poems".

References

Stare Byliny